Alexander Peter "Fats" Delvecchio (born December 4, 1931) is a Canadian former professional ice hockey player, coach, and general manager who spent his entire National Hockey League (NHL) career with the Detroit Red Wings. In a playing career that lasted 24 seasons, from 1951 to 1973, Delvecchio played in 1,549 games, recording 1,281 points. At the time of his retirement, he was second in NHL history in games played, assists and points. He won the Lady Byng Memorial Trophy for sportsmanship and gentlemanly conduct three times, and helped the Red Wings win the Stanley Cup three times. Delvecchio having played 1,549 games with the Red Wings is one of three to spend their entire career with one franchise and play at least 1,500 games with that team (the other two, Steve Yzerman and Nicklas Lidström, also played for the Red Wings). Immediately after retiring in 1973, Delvecchio was named head coach of the team and was also named the team's general manager in 1974, serving in both roles until 1977. Delvecchio was inducted into the Hockey Hall of Fame in 1977, and in 2017 was named one of the "100 Greatest NHL Players" in history.

Playing career
After playing a single junior league season for the Oshawa Generals of the Ontario Hockey Association (OHA) (during which he led the league in assists) and six games with the Indianapolis Capitals of the American Hockey League (AHL), Delvecchio made his NHL debut on March 25, 1951, playing against the Montreal Canadiens in the Red Wings' final game of the season. He spent six games with the team's minor league affiliate, the Indianapolis Capitals of the AHL, scoring nine points, before joining the Red Wings full-time in the 1951–52 season. He helped the team to win the Stanley Cup that year. He would go on to excel both at centre and left wing for 22 full seasons and parts of two others, and was notable for his spot on the "Production Line" with linemates Gordie Howe and Ted Lindsay.

A broken ankle kept Delvecchio out of 22 games in 1956–57, but other than that, he hardly missed games, only missing 14 games over the final 16 seasons of his career.

No player except Nicklas Lidström in NHL history played more games in a career spent with only one team. Despite his impressive career, Delvecchio was never the Red Wings' leading point scorer in a season, primarily due to Howe's presence. The closest he ever came was in the 1969–70 NHL season, where he was just three points behind Howe for the team lead.

Post-playing career
Following his retirement as a player in 1973, Delvecchio served two stints as Detroit's head coach and one as general manager until leaving hockey in 1977 to go into business. Delvecchio is an "Honored Member" of the Detroit Red Wings Alumni Association and is active in its efforts to raise money for children's charities in Metro Detroit. At the time of his retirement, he ranked second in nearly every significant offensive category in Red Wings history behind only Howe. He has since been passed in most of those categories by Steve Yzerman, and in assists by Nicklas Lidström as well, but only Howe and Lidström have played more games as a Red Wing.

Career statistics

Citation:

Achievements
 Third all-time in games played in a Red Wings uniform (Nicklas Lidström and Gordie Howe).
 Retired as the overall leader and held record for 32 years for games played in a career spent with only one team (from 1980 until 2012), since passed by Lidstrom, still a record for forwards.
 3-time Stanley Cup champion with Detroit (1952, 1954, 1955).
 Named a Second Team All-Star in 1953 (at centre) and 1959 (at left wing).
 Played in the All-Star Game 13 times (in 1953, 1954, 1955, 1956, 1957, 1958, 1959, 1961, 1962, 1963, 1964, 1965 and 1967), a total surpassed by only six players.
 Served as team captain for twelve years, a mark surpassed only in Wings' history by Steve Yzerman.
 Remains 11th all-time in NHL history in games played and 27th in points scored.
 Third in points and goals, and fourth in assists, in Red Wings history
 In 1998, he was ranked number 82 on The Hockey News' list of the 100 Greatest Hockey Players.
 Detroit Red Wings #10 retired on November 10, 1991
 On October 16, 2008, The Red Wings unveiled a commemorative statue commissioned by artist Omri R. Amrany.
 In January, 2017, Delvecchio was part of the first group of players to be named one of the '100 Greatest NHL Players' in history.

NHL coaching record

See also
List of Detroit Red Wings award winners
List of ice hockey line nicknames
List of NHL players with 1000 points
List of NHL players with 1000 games played
list of NHL players who spent their entire career with one franchise
Production line (hockey)
List of Detroit Red Wings general managers
List of Detroit Red Wings head coaches

References

External links
 
 Alex Delvecchio's coaching statistics at Hockey-Reference.com
 One for the Ages: Alex Delvecchio's Magical 1972-73 NHL Season

1931 births
Living people
Canadian ice hockey centres
Canadian ice hockey coaches
Canadian people of Italian descent
Detroit Red Wings announcers
Detroit Red Wings captains
Detroit Red Wings coaches
Detroit Red Wings general managers
Detroit Red Wings players
Hockey Hall of Fame inductees
Ice hockey people from Ontario
Indianapolis Capitals players
Sportspeople from Thunder Bay
Lady Byng Memorial Trophy winners
Lester Patrick Trophy recipients
National Hockey League broadcasters
National Hockey League players with retired numbers
Oshawa Generals players
Stanley Cup champions